The 1992 Asian Wrestling Championships were held in Tehran, Iran. The event took place from April 7 to April 10, 1992.

Medal table

Team ranking

Medal summary

Men's freestyle

Men's Greco-Roman

References
UWW Database

Asia
W
Asian Wrestling Championships
W